Francis Ian Andersen (28 July 1925 – 13 May 2020) was an Australian scholar in the fields of biblical studies and Hebrew. Together with A. Dean Forbes(full name Alfred Dean forbes, born 1941), he pioneered the use of computers for the analysis of biblical Hebrew syntax. He taught Old Testament, History, and Religious Studies at various institutions in Australia and the United States, including Macquarie University, the University of Queensland, and Fuller Theological Seminary. His published works include the Tyndale commentary on Job, and Anchor Bible commentaries on Hosea, Amos, Habakkuk and Micah, and over 90 papers (some as co-author).

Biography
Francis Ian Andersen was born in Warwick, Queensland, Australia. In his final high school examinations in 1942, he topped the state of Queensland, winning an Open Scholarship to the University of Queensland. He received a Bachelor of Science from the University of Queensland in Chemistry in 1947. He accepted a position as Demonstrator in Chemistry at the University of Melbourne, where he taught until 1953. He received a Master of Science in Physical Chemistry in 1951, and a Bachelor of Arts in Russian in 1955, both from the University of Melbourne.

In 1952 he married Lois Garrett, a medical doctor. They had five children: John (born 1954), David (born 1956), Martin (born 1958), Nedra (born 1961), and Kathryn (born 1965).

While he was undertaking a postgraduate degree in chemistry at the University of Melbourne, he was attracted into the field of biblical studies by Stuart Barton Babbage, the principal of Ridley College, an Anglican theological college in Melbourne, who persuaded him to join the staff there. In 1957 he received a Fulbright Scholarship to study at Johns Hopkins University in Baltimore, United States under William F. Albright. He received a PhD with a dissertation entitled "Studies in Hebrew Syntax".

In 1960 he returned to Ridley College as Vice-Principal. In 1963 he accepted an appointment as Professor of Old Testament at the Church Divinity School of the Pacific, in Berkeley, California. In 1973 he became Warden of the College of Saint John the Evangelist in Auckland, New Zealand. A year later, he returned to Australia. From 1974-1975 he was Exchange Professor at the Department of Near Eastern Studies at the University of Michigan in Ann Arbor, Michigan. In 1975 he became Associate Professor of History at Macquarie University, in North Ryde, New South Wales, where he taught until 1980. In 1981 he became Professor of Studies in Religion at the University of Queensland, in St Lucia, Queensland.

In 1988 he returned to the United States, where he taught at New College for Advanced Christian Studies, in Berkeley California until 1993. He subsequently became David Allan Hubbard Professor of Old Testament at Fuller Theological Seminary, in Pasadena, California from 1994 to 1997. He later lived in Melbourne, Australia.

His wife Lois died in 2010. In 2015 he married Margaret Johnson nee Beazley. He died on 13 May 2020 at the age of 94.

Work
Andersen had a wide range of research interests, and has been described as a polymath. As can be seen from his bibliography, he published research in such diverse fields as archaeology, biblical studies, chemistry, computational linguistics, Hebrew orthography, morphology, and syntax, pseudepigrapha, Semitic languages, sociology, and theology.

Much of his most significant work was the result of two academic partnerships he formed when he was teaching at the Church Divinity School of the Pacific in Berkeley, California in the 1960s. The first was with David Noel Freedman, who was teaching at the San Francisco Theological Seminary. They teamed up commencing in 1965 to write three commentaries on the minor prophets in the Anchor Bible series, which was edited by Freedman. Andersen wrote a fourth commentary on Habakkuk by himself.

The other research partnership was with A. Dean Forbes, who was Project Manager for Computer Speech Recognition Research at Hewlett-Packard Laboratories in Palo Alto, California. Over a period of more than thirty-five years, Andersen and Forbes carried out research in the field of computer-assisted corpus linguistics, developing a computer database of all the clauses in the Hebrew Bible. During the initial period of research from 1971 to 1979, Andersen transcribed the entire text of the Leningrad Codex of the Hebrew Bible into machine readable form. The orthographic words were then segmented into grammatical segments. A linguistic dictionary was generated by the computer, which included grammatical information on each segment.

This database enabled Andersen and Forbes to produce a series of computer generated keyword-in-context concordances, as well as analyses of the vocabulary of the Old Testament (see bibliography on computational linguistics).  Their database has been licensed to Logos Bible Software and provided with a syntax search engine.

Another area of Andersen’s work arose out of his study of Russian. He became an authority on the book of 2 Enoch, a book of the Pseudepigrapha preserved in the Old Church Slavonic language (see bibliography on Pseudepigrapha).  He made a number of trips to the Soviet Union, including a visit in January 1989 under an exchange agreement between the University of Queensland and the USSR Academy of Sciences. He spent much time examining ancient manuscripts in various libraries in Leningrad (now Saint Petersburg), including the Russian National Library (Saltykor-Shchedrin), the Library of the Oriental Institute, and the Library of the Academy of Sciences. He was able to shed light on a number of important manuscripts hitherto little accessed by Western scholars. One of these was the Karasu-Bazar Codex(Codex by Krymchaks) of the Latter Prophets, which may be the oldest extant biblical codex in Hebrew. Another was manuscript A, representing the shorter recension of 2 Enoch, the very existence of which had previously escaped the attention of Western scholars. He also made a visit to Bulgaria in 1986 and published an article on Pseudepigrapha studies there.

Partial bibliography
 For a more comprehensive bibliography up to 1985, see 
 For a current bibliography of works on computational linguistics, see Andersen-Forbes Resources

Archaeology

Biblical studies

 (This commentary is, according to Tremper Longman, "one of the best on any biblical book.")

Chemistry

Computational linguistics

Hebrew morphology

Hebrew orthography

Hebrew syntax

Pseudepigrapha

Semitic languages

Sociology

Theology

References

Further reading

External links
 Biography from the Australian Institute of Archaeology
 Andersen-Forbes Resources

1925 births
2020 deaths
Australian biblical scholars
Academic staff of Macquarie University
Academic staff of the University of Queensland
Fuller Theological Seminary faculty
University of Queensland alumni
People from Warwick, Queensland
University of Melbourne alumni
Johns Hopkins University alumni
Old Testament scholars
Linguists from Australia
Australian people of Danish descent
University of Michigan staff
Fulbright alumni